Rathauspark is a 40,000 square meter park in Vienna, Austria, located across the street from the Vienna City Hall.

History 
The Emperor Franz Joseph I, in 1863, made known his desire to transform the area into a city park for the residents of Vienna. Toward that end, he removed the military parade ground from the site and tasked Dr. Rudolf Siebeck, the city's gardener, with designing the park. To provide contrast to the large, nearby buildings, including the Austrian Parliament Building and Burg Theater, the park had few established structures.

The park opened in 1873 with two nearly symmetrical segments on the north and south sides of the site. Between the two parks is a large square that became a gathering site throughout the years. Traditionally, the area is used for a Christmas market, a winter skating rink, and a summer outdoor movie venue. 

The park's flora is among its most desirable characteristics. In addition to large groups of native trees and bushes, the park also has exotic trees, including a Japanese Umbrella Tree and an aged Ginkgo Biloba tree.

See also 
 Rathausmann

References 

Parks in Vienna
Innere Stadt